The pentagonal bifrustum or truncated pentagonal bipyramid is the third in an infinite series of bifrustum polyhedra. It has 10 trapezoid and 2 pentagonal faces.

Constructions
The pentagonal bifrustum is the dual polyhedron of a Johnson solid, the elongated pentagonal bipyramid. 

This polyhedron can be constructed by taking a pentagonal bipyramid and truncating the polar axis vertices. In Conway's notation for polyhedra, it can be represented as the polyhedron "t5dP5", meaning the truncation of the degree-five vertices of the dual of a pentagonal prism.

Alternatively, it can be constructed by gluing together two end-to-end pentagonal frustums, or (if coplanar faces are allowed) by gluing together two pentagonal prisms on their pentagonal faces.

Application
In the formation of quasicrystals, a 15-site truncated pentagonal bipyramid structure may form the nucleus of larger structures with five-fold or icosahedral symmetry.

References

Polyhedra